= Daemon Spawn of the Myathlon Cult =

Tabletop role-playing game adventure

Daemon Spawn of the Myathlon Cult is a generic fantasy role-playing adventure published by the British firm Mystic Arts Publications in 1984.

== Plot summary ==
The adventure, designed for 6–8 characters of 1st–3rd level, is divided into three sections. The player characters start by going to Rakshar Monastery to find a rare herb to heal a friend. They then must make a wilderness trip, and eventually enter the Myathlon Crypt of the Atoll Temple.

== Publication history ==
Daemon Spawn of the Myathlon Cult is a 12-page book designed by Rod Stevenson, and includes two maps printed on the inside of a cardstock cover. It was published by Mystic Arts Publications in 1984, the only publication produced by the company.

== Reception ==
In Issue 21 of Imagine (December 1984), Doug Cowie was appalled by the amateurish errors in grammar, punctuation and spelling. He also found that too many details were missing from the adventure, and although he admitted this was the result of using a generic approach to the fantasy rules, he still noted that "I would not recommend it to novice referees; too much is required of the adjudicator in the way of filling in details and bridging gaps in the narrative." Cowie also pointed out that two of the necessary maps were missing from the adventure, the designer suggesting that the gamemaster draw them. He felt that with all of the work necessary to properly prepare the adventure for use, the gamemaster "must now be wondering why she didn't just run one of her own adventures." He concluded with ambivalence, saying, "The price is the saviour of Daemon Spawn. At around £1.60, it is worth buying for the three encounter areas if you are short of ideas or time in your own campaign. All purchasers will have to be prepared to do the development work that the publisher should have done before offering this product for sale."
